Thomas Alfred Ward (2 August 1887 – 16 February 1936) was a South African cricketer who played in 23 Test matches between 1912 and 1924.

A wicket-keeper and useful batsman, Ward made his Test debut on 27 May 1912, the opening Test of the 1912 Triangular Tournament, between South Africa and Australia at Old Trafford. Ward found himself facing the hat-trick ball of Australian bowler Jimmy Matthews. Matthews had just got the wickets of Rolland Beaumont (31) and Sid Pegler (LBW for 0). Facing his first ball in Test cricket, Ward was hit on the pads and was given out LBW, earning himself a golden duck on debut and giving Matthews his hat-trick.

South Africa fell well short of the Australians' first innings total and were forced to follow on. In South Africa's second innings, Matthews again got two wickets in two balls, Herbie Taylor (21) and Reginald Schwarz, caught and bowled for 0. Ward for the second time in his debut match found himself walking to the crease to face Matthews on a hat-trick. Matthews got Ward out caught and bowled giving Ward his second golden duck for the match (a king pair) and Matthews his second hat-trick. This is the only time in Test cricket history when two hat-tricks have been taken in the one match.

Ward died in 1936 as a result of accidental electrocution while working at a gold mine in Transvaal.

References

External links
 

1887 births
1936 deaths
Gauteng cricketers
South Africa Test cricketers
South African cricketers
Wicket-keepers
British people in colonial India
British emigrants to South Africa